Daniel Hackett (born September 11, 1970) is an American water polo player. He competed at the 1996 Summer Olympics and the 2000 Summer Olympics.

See also
 List of men's Olympic water polo tournament goalkeepers

References

External links
 

1970 births
Living people
Sportspeople from Syracuse, New York
American male water polo players
Water polo goalkeepers
Olympic water polo players of the United States
Water polo players at the 1996 Summer Olympics
Water polo players at the 2000 Summer Olympics
Pan American Games gold medalists for the United States
Water polo players at the 1995 Pan American Games
Pan American Games medalists in water polo
Medalists at the 1995 Pan American Games